Desire Street Academy was a 7–12 private school in New Orleans and later Baton Rouge, Louisiana.

History
The school opened in the upper 9th Ward of New Orleans in 2002. The school was forced to relocate multiple times due to flooding from Hurricane Katrina including moving to Niceville, Florida before settling in Baton Rouge. The school was forced to close due to economic reasons in 2009.

The school was an offshoot of the Desire Street Ministries in New Orleans. Former New Orleans Saints quarterback, Danny Wuerffel, was the school's Development Director.

Athletics
Desire Street Academy athletics competed in the LHSAA. Mickey Joseph was head coach and athletic director at the school.

Notable alumni
Lavar Edwards, NFL defensive end
DeAngelo Peterson, NFL tight end

References

Defunct high schools in Louisiana
Defunct high schools in New Orleans
Defunct middle schools in New Orleans
Private middle schools in Louisiana
Educational institutions established in 2002
2002 establishments in Louisiana
2009 disestablishments in Louisiana